Jordan Stolz (born May 21, 2004) is an American speed skater. At the 2023 World Speed Skating Championships , Stolz became the youngest world champion in history. He also became the first male skater to win three individual gold medals at a single World Speed Skating Championship. In addition to the three individual gold medals at the 2023 World Junior Speed Skating Championships, Stolz became the first person to win the individual World Championships and World Junior Championships in the same year, for three separate single distances (500 meters, 1000 meters and 1500 meters).

Early life 
Stolz was born on May 21, 2004, in West Bend, Wisconsin, the son of dental hygenist Jane and police officer Dirk Stolz, originally from Germany. Stolz took up skating on his family’s three-acre backyard pond in the small Wisconsin village of Kewaskum, about 45 minutes north of Milwaukee. Stolz was 5 years old when he saw the 2010 Winter Olympics in Vancouver on television. Stolz was motivated to try skating after being excited from seeing the speed skaters travelling fast on the ice. Stolz's father, Dirk, asked his children if they wanted to try ice skating. In addition, Stolz's father, Dirk, cleared the snow from the pond in their large backyard and bought hockey skates for both his son, Jordan and his elder daughter, Hannah. Stolz's father, Dirk, was very enthusiastic about his chldren skating and installed outdoor lighting at the family backyard pond so that both Jordan and his sister could skate at all hours. 

Stolz credited Apolo Anton Ohno’s and Shani Davis's successes at the 2010 Winter Olympics in Vancouver as inspiration to initially take up skating at the age of 5. Stolz acknowledged that had he not seen the television coverage of the 2010 Olympic Winter Games, Stolz would not have been in the sport of speed skating.  Stolz's father, Dirk, said that the family would do short track until both Jordan and Hannah "got too fast". After initially training in short track, Stolz moved toward the long track after a few years and began winning national championships when he was in fifth grade. 

As Stolz got better and faster, he joined the Badger Speed Skating Club, and then the West Allis Speed Skating Club, which became the Wisconsin Club at the Pettit National Ice Center. As the center was a 90-minute round trip commute from his home, speed skating became a family sport and commitment; his father Dirk is a third-shift deputy sheriff for Milwaukee County who regularly worked from 9 p.m. to 5:30 a.m. so he can be around in the daytime, whilst his mother. Jane is a dental hygienist who worked daytime hours. Since fifth grade, Stolz was homeschooled online for 4½ hours a day, before commuting, practicing and training his sport for 5½ to 6 hours a day.

Career 
Stolz made his international debut during the 2021–22 ISU Speed Skating World Cup in Salt Lake City, where he set the junior world record and American record in the 500 meters with a time of 34.11 and the junior world record in the 1,000 meters with a time of 1:07.62. 

During the Olympic trials at Pettit National Ice Center, he set the track record in the 500 meters and 1,000 meters events previously held by Shani Davis since 2005. As a result, he was named to roster to represent the United States at the 2022 Winter Olympics. He competed in the 500 meters, where he finished in thirteenth place, and the 1000 meters, where he finished in fourteenth place. At 17-years old, he was the third-youngest American male to compete in the Olympics in long track speed skating.

On November 11, 2022, during the first event of the 2022–23 ISU Speed Skating World Cup, Stolz became the youngest man to win an individual World Cup speed skating race. He won the 1500 meters with a time of 1 minute, 44.891 seconds, a track record at Sørmarka Arena. He also won a gold medal in the 1000 meters with a time of 1:08.73. On December 17, 2022, during the fourth event of the 2022–23 ISU Speed Skating World Cup, Stolz won medals in all three events he competed in. He won a gold medal in the 1,000 meters, and silver medals in the 500 meters and 1,500 meters. He set the junior world and American records in the 500 meters with a time of 34.08 seconds. He finished the season ranked among the top-three in the 1,000 and 1,500 meters, and in the top-five of the 500 meters.

At the 2023 World Junior Speed Skating Championships, Stolz won four gold medals (500 meters, 1000 meters, 1500 meters, team sprint) and two bronze medals, and was named the overall World Junior Speed Skating champion.

At the 2023 World Single Distances Speed Skating Championships, Stolz won a gold medal in the 500 meters, 1000 meters and 1500 meters events, becoming the youngest world champion in history. In the 500 meters, he finished with a time of 34.10, while he finished the 1000 meters with a time of 1:07.11, both were the second-fastest time in history for a sea level rink. He became the first male speed skater to win three individual gold medals at a single World Championship. In addition, Stolz broke the record of youngest gold medalist that was previously held by female Femke Kok, who took team sprint gold in 2020, at age 19. Before Stolz, the youngest world champion in an individual event was female Martina Sáblíková, who won the first of her record 16 distance titles at age 19 in 2007.

Personal life 
Stolz, like most speedskaters, is an excellent cyclist; he is able to average 22 mph on Wisconsin’s country roads and many hills, covering 30 miles within 90 minutes to work on his endurance.

Stolz eats pizza every day before training. His favorite restaurants are Jimmy John's, Texas Roadhouse and The Fox & Hounds in his hometown of Kewaskum. Stolz's hobbies outside of skating, include hunting, fishing and long camping trips to the remote Alaskan wilderness; the family travels to Alaska during the summer to fish halibut and salmon and hunt moose.

Personal records

References

External links

2004 births
Living people
American male speed skaters
People from Kewaskum, Wisconsin
People from West Bend, Wisconsin
Speed skaters at the 2020 Winter Youth Olympics
Olympic speed skaters of the United States
Speed skaters at the 2022 Winter Olympics
World Single Distances Speed Skating Championships medalists
21st-century American people